Castlemartyr  was a constituency represented in the Irish House of Commons from 1676 to 1800.

Borough
This constituency was the borough of Castlemartyr in County Cork.  After its establishment in 1676 it had a sovereign, 12 burgesses and freemen. It was the base of Henry Boyle, Speaker of the Irish House of Commons from 1733 to 1756.

History
In the Patriot Parliament of 1689 summoned by James II, Castlemartyr was not represented. Under the terms of the Act of Union 1800, the constituency was disenfranchised and abolished in 1801.  The 2nd Earl of Shannon received £15,000 compensation for its disenfranchisement.

Members of Parliament, 1676–1801

1689–1801

Notes

References

Bibliography

Johnston-Liik, E. M. (2002). History of the Irish Parliament, 1692–1800, Publisher: Ulster Historical Foundation, 
T. W. Moody, F. X. Martin, F. J. Byrne, A New History of Ireland 1534–1691, Oxford University Press, 1978
Tim Cadogan and Jeremiah Falvey, A Biographical Dictionary of Cork, 2006, Four Courts Press 

Constituencies of the Parliament of Ireland (pre-1801)
Historic constituencies in County Cork
1676 establishments in Ireland
1800 disestablishments in Ireland
Constituencies established in 1676
Constituencies disestablished in 1800